The Old Monk's Tale is a 1913 American drama film directed by J. Searle Dawley, produced by The Edison Company and released by General Film Company. It features the first known film appearance of Harold Lloyd as an uncredited Yaqui Indian at a party.

Cast
 Ben F. Wilson as The Handsome Stranger (as Benjamin Wilson)
 Laura Sawyer as Ramona, The Coquette
 James Gordon as Allesandro
 Charles Sutton as The Monk
 Jessie McAllister as The Temptress
 Harold Lloyd as Yaqui Indian (bit part) (uncredited)

See also
 Harold Lloyd filmography

References

External links
 

1913 films
1913 drama films
1913 short films
American silent short films
American black-and-white films
Silent American drama films
Films directed by J. Searle Dawley
1910s American films